Xenia Knoll and Mandy Minella were the defending champions but Minella chose not to participate. Knoll partnered alongside Susan Bandecchi, but lost in the first round to Karola Bejenaru and Elizabeth Halbauer.

Estelle Cascino and Camilla Rosatello won the title, defeating Conny Perrin and Eden Silva in the final, 7–6(7–4), 6–4.

Seeds

Draw

Draw

References
Main Draw

Elle Spirit Open - Doubles
2021 Doubles